My Life with Caroline is a 1941 American comedy film directed by Lewis Milestone and starring Ronald Colman and Anna Lee, in her second Hollywood film and her first in a starring role. The screenplay was written by John Van Druten and Arnold Belgard.

Plot
Wealthy publisher Anthony Mason weds ditsy socialite Caroline, who continues to chase men while married. Caroline flirts with Paco Del Valle while at a charity ball in Alpine Lodge, Idaho, and Paco then asks her father Mr. Bliss for permission to marry his daughter. Bliss tells them that they need to ask her husband, and Caroline and Paco telegraph Anthony in New York.

As Caroline and Paco await an eastbound plane at the airport, Mason has just arrived. Seeing the two together, Mason recalls a nearly identical situation that occurred two years earlier when Caroline was enamored with sculptor Paul Martindale in Palm Beach, Florida. Caroline sees Mason's pilot carrying a bust in her image that had been sculpted by Paul and follows the pilot to where Mason had been waiting.

Paul, who also attended the charity ball, joins Anthony, Caroline, Bliss and Paco at the airport. Caroline tells Anthony that she cannot decide between Paco and Paul, forcing Anthony to work to win her back.

Cast
 Ronald Colman as Anthony Mason
 Anna Lee as Caroline Mason
 Charles Winninger as Mr. Bliss
 Reginald Gardiner as Paul Martindale
 Gilbert Roland as Paco Del Valle
 Kay Leslie as Helen
 Hugh O'Connell as Muirhead
 Murray Alper as Jenkins
 Matt Moore as Walters
 Richard Carle as Reverend Dr. Curtis (uncredited)
 Robert Greig as Albert (uncredited)
 Barry Norton as Cocktail Club Patron (uncredited)
 Feodor Chaliapin Jr. as Sky Man (uncredited)
 Nicholas Soussanin as Pinnock (uncredited)

Background
In 1940, William Hawks (brother of film director Howard Hawks), along with Ronald Colman, Charles Boyer, Irene Dunne, Lewis Milestone and Anatole Litvak, founded United Producers Corporation. The company intended to make 10 films for RKO, and My Life with Caroline was the first of five that were to star Colman.

The film's screenplay was written by John Van Druten and Arnold Belgard, adapted from Louis Verneuil's film The Train for Venice, which was based upon the play The Train for Venice, written by Verneuil and Georges Berr.

Milestone had tested actresses Miriam Hopkins, Paulette Goddard and Jean Arthur for the role of Caroline but decided on Anna Lee after seeing her in the British film Young Man's Fancy. My Life With Caroline was Lee's Hollywood debut in a starring role.

The film's sets were designed by art director Nicolai Remisoff.

Reception
In a contemporary review for The New York Times, critic Bosley Crowther wrote: "Mr. Colman locks with Mr. Gardiner in what is supposed to be a battle of wits, and thus until the end of the picture they merely pummel one another with flat gags. There must be some logical explanation why Lewis Milestone, who, after all, is no fool, should put his usually fine directorial hand to a story as vapid as this. There must be some further explanation why Mr. Colman, Mr. Gardiner and Miss Lee, who are all of them competent performers, should be wasted on such obvious frippery. But it's too much for our comprehension. Let's just call 'My Life With Caroline' time ill spent, and draw the curtain quietly thereon."

The film recorded a loss of $32,000.

References

External links

 
 
 
 

1941 films
American romantic comedy films
RKO Pictures films
1941 romantic comedy films
American black-and-white films
Films based on works by Louis Verneuil
Films directed by Lewis Milestone
Films set in New York (state)
Films set in Florida
Films set in Idaho
American remakes of French films
1940s English-language films
1940s American films